Die Blutgräfin is the eleventh album of Untoten. It is a concept album based on the life of Elizabeth Báthory.

Track listing
All tracks written and produced by David A. Line

Disk 1:
"Schauplatz des Verbrechens" – 1:38
"„Nur ein Tropfen Blut!“" – 4:20
"Die Jagd" – 4:37
"Blutrot, die Liebe" – 5:43
"Die Gräfin des Blutes" – 2:32
"Geistermädchen" – 3:40
"Unheimlich" – 1:32
"Blutmond" – 5:07
"Alraunenblut" – 1:36
"„Ich wär so gern...“" – 2:40
"Hure der Finsternis" – 5:52
"Der Singvogel" – 1:30
"Koste das Blut!" – 5:23
"Bluthochzeit" – 4:52
"Jedem das Seine" – 3:45

Disk 2:
"Lustgarten (Vorspiel)" – 2:13
"Ficzko" – 4:35
"In den Katakomben" – 1:22
"Die Grube und das Pendel" – 4:20
"Domine" – 0:32
"Die Zeit steht still" – 5:55
"Hexenreich" – 3:54
"Blitz und Donner" – 4:09
"Zauberspiegel" – 1:15
"Blutopfer" – 4:57
"Flieg nun davon!" – 1:58
"Die Gruft" – 4:30
"Die Saat des Bösen" – 5:55

Personnel 

 David A. Line – vocals
 Greta Csatlós – vocals

External links
 Untoten Discography Info

2006 albums
Untoten albums
Cultural depictions of Elizabeth Báthory